Salum Ageze Kashafali (born 25 November 1993) is a visually impaired Norwegian Paralympic athlete competing in T12-classification sprinting events. He won the gold medal in the men's 100 metres T12 event at the 2020 Summer Paralympics held in Tokyo, Japan. He also set a T12 world record of 10.43 seconds.

Career 

In 2019, he competed both in able-bodied and para-athletic competitions. In June 2019, he set a new world record of 10.45s in the 100 metres T12 event at the Bislett Games held in Oslo, Norway. In August 2019, at the 2019 Norwegian Athletics Championships, he won the gold medal in the men's 100 metres with a time of 10.37s.

At the 2019 World Para Athletics Championships held in Dubai, United Arab Emirates, he won the gold medal in the men's 100 metres T12 event with a time of 10.54s. This meant that he qualified to represent Norway at the 2020 Summer Paralympics held in Tokyo, Japan.

In 2021, he won the gold medal in the men's 100 metres T12 event at the 2021 World Para Athletics European Championships held in Bydgoszcz, Poland.

Personal life 

He is visually impaired as a result of Stargardt disease.

Achievements

Athletics

Para-athletics

References

External links 
 

1993 births
Living people
Place of birth missing (living people)
Democratic Republic of the Congo emigrants to Norway
Sportspeople from Bergen
Norwegian male sprinters
Paralympic athletes with a vision impairment
World record holders in Paralympic athletics
Norwegian Athletics Championships winners
Paralympic athletes of Norway
Athletes (track and field) at the 2020 Summer Paralympics
Medalists at the 2020 Summer Paralympics
Paralympic medalists in athletics (track and field)
Paralympic gold medalists for Norway
21st-century Norwegian people